H. W. Ambrose House, also known as Dunmeade, is a historic home located at Conway in Horry County, South Carolina. It was built from 1924 to 1926, and is a large two-and-one-half-story, cruciform plan, brick residence in the Tudor Revival style.  It features a steeply-pitched gable roof sheathed in slate. Also on the property are a garage and pool house.

It was listed on the National Register of Historic Places in 1986.

References

External links
National Register of Historic Places Inventory-Nomination Form: H.W. Ambrose House, June 1986
Ambrose, H. W., House - Conway, South Carolina - U.S. National Register of Historic Places on Waymarking.com

Houses on the National Register of Historic Places in South Carolina
Houses completed in 1924
Houses in Horry County, South Carolina
National Register of Historic Places in Horry County, South Carolina
Buildings and structures in Conway, South Carolina